The Louisville and Nashville Passenger Station and Express Building is a historic Louisville and Nashville Railroad passenger train depot in Pensacola, Florida.

History
It is located at 239 North Alcaniz Street.

The building was constructed between 1912 and 1913 with elements of Prairie School, Spanish Mission, and Italianate architectural styles.

On June 11, 1979, it was added to the U.S. National Register of Historic Places.

In 1984, the depot was refurbished and incorporated into the Pensacola Grand Hotel (now the Crowne Plaza Pensacola Grand Hotel) that was built just behind it. The renovation of the depot was a painstaking process that used as much of the original material as possible.  The building houses the lobby, shops, restaurant and meeting rooms of the hotel. The hotel has housed two Presidents of the United States, including President Barack Obama in 2010.

Specific use for passenger trains
Until 1971 the Louisville and Nashville Railroad operated the Gulf Wind (New Orleans - Mobile - Jacksonville). And until 1955 the Frisco Railway ran a section of the Sunnyland from the station to Memphis via Tupelo.

See also
Pensacola (Amtrak station)

References

External links
 Escambia County listings

Railway stations on the National Register of Historic Places in Florida
Pensacola, Florida
Former railway stations in Florida
National Register of Historic Places in Escambia County, Florida
Railway stations in the United States opened in 1913
Buildings and structures in Pensacola, Florida
1913 establishments in Florida
Transportation buildings and structures in Escambia County, Florida